A tree k-spanner (or simply k-spanner) of a graph  is a spanning subtree  of  in which the distance between every pair of vertices is at most  times their distance in .

Known Results

There are several papers written on the subject of tree spanners. One of these was entitled Tree Spanners written by mathematicians Leizhen Cai and Derek Corneil, which explored theoretical and algorithmic problems associated with tree spanners.

 A tree 1-spanner, if it exists, is a minimum spanning tree and can be found in  time (in terms of complexity) for a weighted graph, where . Furthermore, every tree 1-spanner admissible weighted graph contains a unique minimum spanning tree.
 A tree 2-spanner can be constructed in  time, and the tree -spanner problem is NP-complete for any fixed integer .
 The minimum 1-spanner of a weighted graph can be found in  time.
 For any fixed rational number , it is NP-complete to determine whether a weighted graph contains a tree t-spanner, even if all edge weights are positive integers.
 A tree spanner (or a minimum tree spanner) of a digraph can be found in linear time.
 A digraph contains at most one tree spanner.
 The quasi-tree spanner of a weighted digraph can be found in  time.

See also 
Graph spanner
Geometric spanner

References

.

Spanning tree